Director's Cut is a 2016 American independent black comedy horror film directed by Adam Rifkin, starring Penn Jillette and Missi Pyle. Principal photography took place in September 2014 and lasted four weeks. It opened the Slamdance Film Festival on January 22, 2016.

On November 9, 2017, it was announced that the film had been picked up for distribution by Epic Pictures through its new label Dread Central Presents.

Plot

Herbert Blount aspires to replace the real director of a movie and make it his own by capturing the lead actress and inflicting much horror upon her in his version.

Cast

 Penn Jillette as Herbert Blount
 Missi Pyle as herself, an actress who portrays Mabel
 Harry Hamlin as himself, an actor who portrays Godfrey Winters
 Hayes MacArthur as himself, an actor who portrays Reed
 Lin Shaye as Captain Wheeler
 Gilbert Gottfried as Superintendent
 Adam Rifkin as himself, the director of the film
 Marshall Bell as a moving company employee
 Nestor Carbonell as Perry, a crime scene investigator
 Teller as Rudy Nelson
 Dave Anthony as Richard Speck
 Bree Olson as a nurse
 Bridey Elliott as a wardrobe assistant
 Dean Cameron as Brian
 Robert Belushi as Ashby

Marketing
For its presentation at the Slamdance Film Festival, the film was described this way:  "This ultimate meta-movie is an insane genre-bending cinematic sleight of hand trick about a cineaste stalker who kidnaps his favorite actress and forces her to star in his amateur movie."

Release
Director’s Cut was released by Epic Pictures on Blu-ray through its new label Dread Central Presents on June 5, 2018.

References

External links
Official site

2016 films
American comedy horror films
Crowdfunded films
Films directed by Adam Rifkin
Films with screenplays by Penn Jillette
2016 comedy horror films
Films about actors
Films about film directors and producers
Films about fandom
Films about filmmaking
Films set in Los Angeles
2010s English-language films
2010s American films